Dennis McCoy may refer to:

 Dennis McCoy (BMX rider) (born 1966), American BMX rider
 Dennis McCoy (alpine skier) (born 1945), American former alpine skier
 Dennis C. McCoy, former American politician in the Maryland House of Delegates